, known by the pen name , was a Japanese manga artist, best known for his series Lupin III.

Life and career 
Katō was born in Hamanaka, Hokkaido; he began drawing at a very young age, but did not draw manga until junior high school, when his manga strips were used in the school newspaper. After graduating, he moved to Tokyo to look for work and began going to a technical school for electronics, continuing to draw for fun. While working in a dōjinshi group with other artists, he was recruited by Futabasha and drew yonkoma. He was an assistant to Naoki Tsuji on Zero-sen Hayato and Tiger Mask.

Lupin III made its debut on August 10, 1967, in the first issue of the magazine Weekly Manga Action; the cover was also drawn by Monkey Punch. It went on to become an extremely popular and successful media franchise, spawning numerous manga, six animated television series, seven animated feature films, two live-action films, three OVAs, near-yearly television specials since 1989, music CDs, video games, and a musical. Monkey Punch himself even directed the 1996 film, Dead or Alive.

In April 2005, he became the professor of Manga and Animation at Otemae University, in its Faculty of Media and Arts, and was a visiting professor at Tokyo University of Technology in May 2010.

On April 21, 2007, Monkey Punch participated in a series of lectures on the "interaction of manga and culture throughout the world" at the Freer Gallery of Art. In 2008, Monkey Punch was a judge at the Japanese Ministry of Foreign Affairs' Second International Manga Awards.

He designed the characters for the pachinko game CR Ginroku Gijinden Roman in 2012. The following year an anime adaptation of the game began airing on January 7, 2013, with Monkey Punch's designs adapted by Satoshi Hirayama, and was streamed with English subtitles on Crunchyroll.

Monkey Punch participated in the writing of the 2014 live-action film adaptation of Lupin III.

Personal life and death 
Monkey Punch resided in Sakura, Chiba, until his death. He died on April 11, 2019, due to pneumonia.

Pen name 
Katō first started to work as a professional manga artist, under the pen name . The editor of the magazine that "discovered him" then suggested the pen name Monkey Punch. Katō claims that he did not like the name, but agreed because it was his boss's idea and his next series was only supposed to be a three-month project. When the series, Lupin III, became popular, he was stuck with the name.

Katō's younger brother, worked as his assistant on Lupin III. For years it was widely believed that the pen name Monkey Punch referred to the two brothers working together as a creative duo, but in a 2017 interview they clarified that this idea stemmed from a mistaken magazine article, and that the name Monkey Punch should be understood to refer exclusively to the older brother Kazuhiko, who did all of the main creative work concerning the characters, story, and the main drawings. The younger brother Teruhiko explained that he was exclusively doing assistant work.

Style 
Monkey Punch has stated that Osamu Tezuka was the reason he wanted to become a manga artist. He acknowledged the influence Mad magazine artist Mort Drucker had on his work.

Awards 
He received the Inkpot Award in 1981 and a special Tokyo Anime Award in 2015.

List of works

1960s 
 1962
 Number 5 + α
 Gun Hustler
 Rebellious Child
 List the Criminal
 Open Homicide
 Clandestine Work
 The Man Who Does Not Have a Shadow
 The Person Whom It Uses
 Vengeance (Fukushu) as Kazuhiko Katō
 Ghost Story Guy as Kazuhiko Katō
 1965
  as Eiji Gamuta
 Needless Axle of Wilderness
 Pink Guard Man ... Blues of the Assassin (Pinku Gado Man ... Hissatsu no Burusu)
 Outsider (Autosaida Monkey Punch)
 1967
 The Ginza Whirlwind Child (Ginza Senpuji)
 
 1968
 Western Samurai (Uesutan Samurai)
 1969
 Pandora

1970s 
 1970
 Spy Nobility (Supai Shinzoku)
 Document Mania (Dokyumento Kyo)
 
 Tac Tics
 1971
 Multi (Maruchi)
 Mysterious Jaguarman (Kaijin Jagaman)
 
 1972
 
 Makao
 Monsieur Koga
 Key
 1973
 Sufficiently Motivated (Yaruki Jubun)
 Decoy House Slug (Kikuya Namekuji)
 Venus of Diamond (Daia no Binasu)
 1974
 I Am Casanova (Ore wa Kazanoba)
 Color Girl (Kara Garu)
 Isshuku Ippan (一宿一飯)
 
 1976
 Little Dracula (Dorakyura-kun)
 Up-Up Balloon (UP-UP Barun)
 1977
 
 
 Transparent Gentleman (Tomei Shinshi)
 1978
 Time Agent (Jikan Ejento)
 Kaiketsu Zero

1980s 
 1980
 
 Boy
 Botchan (anime, character design)
 1981
 
 1982
 Space Adventure Team Mechabunger (Uchū Bōken-tai Mekabanja)
 Another work from Cinderella Boy.
 1983
 Roller Boy (Rora Boi)
 Lucky Monkey (Raki Monki)
 1984
 
 
 1986
 Pinky Punky (ピンキィ パンキィ Pinkī Pankī)
 Dirty Joke (ダアティ ジョオク Dāteī Jōku)

1990s 
 1991
 Monkey Punch no Sekai: Alice (December 13)
 Scramble Saver Kids
 1997
 One Thousand and One Nights' Story (Senya Ichiya Monogatari)

2000s 
 2004
 Mankatsu (anime)

2010s 
 2013

References

External links 

 Official website 
 
 
 
 Monkey Punch at the Lambiek Comiclopedia
 Lupin III Network 

Lupin the Third
Academic staff of Otemae University
Manga artists from Hokkaido
1937 births
2019 deaths
Deaths from pneumonia in Japan
Inkpot Award winners
Pseudonymous artists
Pseudonymous writers
Hamanaka, Hokkaido